Borki Nizińskie  is a village in the administrative district of Gmina Tuszów Narodowy, within Mielec County, Subcarpathian Voivodeship, in south-eastern Poland.

The village has a population of 600.

References

Villages in Mielec County